is a Japanese writer of historical fiction. She has won the Shibata Renzaburo Prize, the Chūōkōron Literary Prize, and the Naoki Prize.

Early life
Kiuchi was born in 1967 in Tokyo, Japan. She attended Chuo University, and upon graduation took a publishing job editing various magazines, including the Japanese version of the American teen magazine Sassy. She started her own magazine, then quit the publishing job to work as a freelance writer and editor.

Writing career
Her debut novel  , set in Kyoto in the late Edo period, was published in 2004. Four years later her book , a collection of linked stories taking place in Tokyo at different times from the Edo period to the Shōwa period, was published. At the 2nd Waseda University Tsubouchi Shōyō Prize ceremony Yoko Tawada received the Grand Prize, but Kiuchi received the Encouragement Prize for Myōgadani no neko. The next year Kiuchi won  the 144th Naoki Prize for her historical novel , a story about a samurai and a courtesan in a Nezu red-light district brothel just after the Meiji Restoration. The committee specifically praised Kiuchi's attention to historical detail. Kiuchi won the award on her first nomination, in contrast to co-winner Shūsuke Michio, a five-time Naoki Prize nominee.

Kiuchi's first novel after winning the Naoki Prize was her 2011 book , a story set in Asakusa immediately after the end of World War II. Her novel , about a family of Yabuhara comb crafters at the end of the Edo period, was published in 2013. The next year Kushihikichimori won Kiuchi the 27th Shibata Renzaburo Prize for established writers of genre fiction, the 9th Chūōkōron Literary Prize, and the 8th Shinran Prize, which is awarded to a work of fiction deeply rooted in Japanese spiritual culture. Her short story collection  was published by Chuokoron-Shinsha in 2016. Her book  was a finalist for the 34th Oda Sakunosuke Prize in 2017.

Recognition
 2009 2nd Waseda University Tsubouchi Shōyō Encouragement Prize
 2011 144th Naoki Prize (2010下)
 2014 9th Chūōkōron Literary Prize
 2014 27th Shibata Renzaburo Prize
 2014 8th Shinran Prize

Works
 , Asukomu, 2004, 
 , Kawade Shobō Shinsha, 2005, 
 , Heibonsha, 2008, 
 , Shueisha, 2010, 
 , Sonī Magajinzu, 2008, 
 , Bungeishunjū, 2011, 
 , Shueisha, 2013, 
 , Chuokoron-Shinsha, 2016, 
 , Shinchosha, 2017,

References

1967 births
Living people
21st-century Japanese novelists
21st-century Japanese women writers
Japanese women novelists
Naoki Prize winners
Writers from Tokyo
Chuo University alumni